Sira is one of the 224 constituencies in the Karnataka Legislative Assembly of Karnataka, in South India. It is a segment of Chitradurga Lok Sabha constituency.

Members of Vidhan Sabha

Mysore State
 1951: B. N. Remegowda, Independent
 1957 (Seat-1): T. Taregowda, Indian National Congress
 1957 (Seat-2): P. Anjanappa, Indian National Congress
 1962: C. J. Muckkannappa, Independent
 1967: B. N. Ramegowda, Indian National Congress
 1972: B. Puttakamaiah, Indian National Congress

Karnataka State
 1978: S.Lingaiah, Indian National Congress (Indira)
 1983: P. Mudlegowda, Independent
 1985: C. P. Mudalagiriyappa, Indian National Congress
 1989: S. K. Dasappa, Indian National Congress
 1994: B. Sathyanarayana, Janata Dal
 1999: P. M. Ranganath, Indian National Congress
 2004: B. Sathyanarayana, Janata Dal (Secular)
 2008: T. B. Jayachandra, Indian National Congress
 2013: T. B. Jayachandra, Indian National Congress
 2018: B. Sathyanarayana, Janata Dal (Secular) (Died in August 2020)
 2020 ^ : Rajesh Gowda, Bharatiya Janata Party (by-poll)

Election results

2020 Bypoll

2004 Assembly Elections
 Sathyanarayana B (JD-S) : 33,166 votes  
 Sreenivasaiah (bhoonahally Seenappa, Congress) : 25073
 Badeeranna B K (BJP) : 20,022
 Sidhanna S K (Ind) : 17192

1999 Assembly Elections
 P.M. Ranganath (INC) : 42,263 votes  
 B. Satyanarayana (JD-S) : 16,609 votes

See also
 List of constituencies of Karnataka Legislative Assembly
 Tumkur district

References

Assembly constituencies of Karnataka
Tumkur district